The 2019 Newfoundland and Labrador Men's Curling Championship (also known as the Tankard), the men's provincial curling championship for Newfoundland and Labrador, was held from January 29 to February 3 at the Bally Haly Golf & Curling Club in St. John's. The winning Andrew Symonds team represented Newfoundland and Labrador at the 2019 Tim Hortons Brier, Canada's national men's curling championship in Brandon, Manitoba.

Teams
With 12 teams entering the event, it is the biggest Newfoundland and Labrador Tankard field in over 15 years.

Teams are as follows:

Knockout brackets

A Event

B Event

C Event

Playoffs
As the winner of two events, the Andrew Symonds rink needed to be beaten twice.  Symonds defeated Rowsell in the first game, so a second game was not necessary.

Semifinal
Sunday, February 3, 9:30am

Final
Sunday, February 3, 2:30pm

Since Symonds won the semifinal, a final was not necessary.

References

External links
Scores

2019 Tim Hortons Brier
Tankard, 2019
Tankard, 2019
Tankard, 2019
January 2019 sports events in Canada
February 2019 sports events in Canada